The Persian science and literary monthly magazine Mihr (English: The Sun, Persian: مهر) was published between 1933/34 and 1967/68 in a total of 30 issues. The editor was Majid Movaqqar, and since 1953 the bibliographer, historian, and scholar of Persian studies Iraj Afshar became his successor. Afshars father, the scholar Mahmoud Afshar, founded the journal Āyandeh, that paid special attention to Persian language.

References

External links
  in Encyclopædia Iranica
 Online-Version: Mihr

1933 establishments in Iran
1967 disestablishments in Iran
Defunct literary magazines
Defunct magazines published in Iran
Literary magazines published in Iran
Magazines established in 1933
Magazines disestablished in 1967
Magazines published in Tehran
Monthly magazines published in Iran
Persian-language magazines